Monmouth Troy was one of the two former railway stations at Monmouth. It was built in 1857 by the Coleford, Monmouth, Usk and Pontypool Railway and was used by several other branch lines as the local rail network expanded. The station closed in January 1964 following the closure of the last two lines to the station, the Wye Valley Railway and the Ross and Monmouth Railway.

History
Monmouth Troy was built for the Coleford, Monmouth, Usk and Pontypool Railway near to Troy House, and opened on 12 October 1857. It was the larger of the two stations in Monmouth, the other station being Monmouth Mayhill. The Ross & Monmouth Railway found its way to Monmouth Troy in 1874 followed shortly by the Wye Valley Railway in 1876, the Coleford Railway came later in 1883.

The Coleford Railway closed in 1917. The Coleford, Monmouth, Usk and Pontypool Railway withdrew passenger services in 1955, followed by freight services on 12 October 1957. The Wye Valley Railway and Ross and Monmouth Railway struggled on until 1959, when both railways withdrew passenger services. Freight services on both lines to Monmouth Troy were continued until 5 January 1964 when the station officially closed to rail services. If Monmouth had remained a county town it would have been the first county town in Britain to lose all its railway services.

Goods yard

Monmouth Troy also had a large goods yard; this was constructed at the same time as the station, and outlived it by nine months until October 1964 when its non-rail depot closed.

Tunnel
The short tunnel directly to the west of the station that took the railway beneath Gibraltar Hill was called Monmouth Troy tunnel. It was 140 yards (130 m) long. It is sometimes confused with the A40 road tunnel, named Gibraltar Tunnel, that passes under the same hill.

Monmouth Troy today
During the construction of a building estate which would have destroyed the derelict station building, the Gloucestershire Warwickshire Railway bought it and moved the building stone-by-stone from Monmouth and rebuilt it on the restored railway. Re-construction at Winchcombe on the restored line began in 1987 and was completed in 1999; the station is now known as Winchcombe railway station.

See also
Winchcombe railway station

Gallery

Notes

References 

 The Gloucestershire Warwickshire Railways Website
 Information on Monmouth Troy

External links
 An article on the station including photos
 Memories of Monmouth Troy
 A website about the Ross and Monmouth Railway

Former Great Western Railway stations
Disused railway stations in Monmouthshire
Transport in Monmouthshire
History of Monmouthshire
Railway stations in Great Britain opened in 1857
Railway stations in Great Britain closed in 1964
Buildings and structures in Monmouth, Wales
1857 establishments in Wales